Bodil Agneta Jönsson (born September 12, 1942, in Helsingborg) is a Swedish physicist and author, who is professor emeritus at the Department of Rehabilitation Technology at Lund University since 1993. Between 1999 and 2019, she has authored about 20 books. She received H. M. The King's Medal in the 8th size in 1997, and was awarded a gold medal by the Royal Swedish Academy of Engineering Sciences in 2013.

References 

1942 births
Living people
Swedish physicists
Swedish writers
Swedish women physicists
Academic staff of Lund University